Bernard S. Cohn (1928-2003) was an American anthropologist and scholar of British colonialism in India, primarily affiliated with the University of Chicago. Born in Brooklyn, New York, Cohn received a B.A. in history from the University of Wisconsin–Madison in 1949 and a Ph.D. in anthropology from Cornell University in 1954. From 1952-3 he engaged in field research in India as a Fulbright scholar. In addition to Chicago, he also taught at the University of Rochester and was a research assistant for the US Army at Fort Benning. In 1968, he was elected to the American Academy of Arts and Sciences.

Works
Cohn's seminal contributions included work on India's caste system, by which he established that caste was solidified as a concept by the British codification of it, as well as the establishment of historical anthropology as a means to link the disciplines of anthropology and history. This work intersected with earlier work about syncretism between these two disciplines by Alfred L. Kroeber, as well as essays by Clifford Geertz. Cohn's works include Colonialism and its Forms of Knowledge (1996), An Anthropologist Among the Historians (1987) and India: The Social Anthropology of a Civilization (1971). His students, including, Nicholas Dirks, Ronald Inden, and Ritty Lukose have continued in the vein of his work. His work has been closely studied by members of Subaltern Studies, especially Ranajit Guha.

External links
Obituary from the University of Chicago
Guide to the Bernard Cohn Papers 1942-2000 at the University of Chicago Special Collections Research Center

University of Chicago faculty
Cornell University alumni
1928 births
2003 deaths
University of Wisconsin–Madison College of Letters and Science alumni